Frederick Thomas Letcher  (born January 1868) was a Major League Baseball outfielder. He played in six games for the 1891 Milwaukee Brewers of the American Association. He had an extensive minor league career that lasted from 1890 through 1911 and included two seasons as player/manager in 1908 and 1910.

Sources

1868 births
Major League Baseball outfielders
Baseball players from Ohio
Milwaukee Brewers (AA) players
19th-century baseball players
Minor league baseball managers
Seattle Hustlers players
Indianapolis Hoosiers (minor league) players
Green Bay Bays players
Atlanta Windjammers players
Nashville Tigers players
Jacksonville Jacks players
Des Moines Prohibitionists players
Des Moines Indians players
Grand Rapids Rippers players
Grand Rapids Gold Bugs players
Minneapolis Millers (baseball) players
Fort Wayne Indians players
Omaha Omahogs players
Tacoma Tigers players
Marion Oilworkers players
Peoria Distillers players
South Bend Greens players
Evansville River Rats players
Terre Haute Hottentots players
Fond du Lac Webfoots players
Madison Senators players
Appleton Papermakers players
Regina Bone Pilers players
Brandon Angels players
Saskatoon Berrypickers players
Year of death missing
People from Bryan, Ohio
Marinette (minor league baseball) players